Cylindropuntia leptocaulis, the desert Christmas cactus, desert Christmas cholla, pencil cactus, or tasajillo, is a species of cholla cactus.

Distribution and habitat
Cylindropuntia leptocaulis is widely distributed in deserts, grasslands, chaparral, and woodlands in the Southwestern United States and several states in Northern Mexico.

Description
Branches are narrow, 3–5 mm across. Spines 0-1 (occasionally as many as 3) at each areole. Flowers open in the late afternoon and are pale yellow or greenish yellow, with occasional red tips.

Around December, the plant grows red berries that when consumed, can have an intoxicating effect. The fruits are crushed and mixed with a beverage by the Apache, Chiricahua, and Mescalero to produce narcotic effects.

Gallery

References

External links
Cylindropuntia leptocaulis photo gallery at Opuntia Web
Cylindropuntia leptocaulis in the Lady Bird Johnson Wildflower Center database

leptocaulis
Cacti of Mexico
Cacti of the United States
Flora of the Southwestern United States
Flora of Northwestern Mexico
Flora of Northeastern Mexico
Flora of Sonora
Flora of Arizona
Flora of New Mexico
Flora of Texas
Flora of Oklahoma
North American desert flora
Flora of the Sonoran Deserts
Plants used in Native American cuisine
Flora without expected TNC conservation status